The FIS Alpine World Ski Championships are organized by the International Ski Federation (FIS).

History
The first world championships in alpine skiing were held in 1931. During the 1930s, the event was held annually in Europe, until interrupted by the outbreak of World War II, preventing a 1940 event.  An event was held in 1941, but included competitors only from nations from the Axis powers or nations not at war with them. The results were later cancelled by the FIS in 1946 because of the limited number of participants, so they are not considered official.

Following the war, the championships were connected with the Olympics for several decades. From 1948 through 1982, the competition was held in even-numbered years, with the Winter Olympics acting as the World Championships through 1980, and a separate competition held in even-numbered non-Olympic years. The 1950 championships in the United States at Aspen were the first held outside of Europe and the first official championships separate of the Olympics since 1939.

The combined event was dropped after 1948 with the addition of the giant slalom in 1950, but returned in 1954 as a "paper" race which used the results of the three events: downhill, giant slalom, and slalom. During Olympic years from 1956 through 1980, FIS World Championship medals were awarded in the combined, but not Olympic medals. The combined returned as a separately run event in 1982 with its own downhill and two-run slalom, and the Super-G was added to the program in 1987. (Both were also added to the Olympics in 1988.)

There were no World Championships in 1983 or 1984 and since 1985, they have been scheduled in odd-numbered years, independent of the Winter Olympics. A lack of snow in southern Spain in 1995 caused a postponement to the following year.

Men's champions

  Held as part of the Winter Olympics (9).

Titles by nation

Women's champions

  Held as part of the Winter Olympics (9).

Titles by nation

Nations team event

* won gold medals as reserve skiers

See also
List of Olympic medalists in alpine skiing

References and notes

External links
FIS-ski.com – official results for the FIS Alpine World Ski Championships

FIS Alpine World Ski Championships
World Champions
Alpine skiing